Thunder Drum is a Canadian documentary film, directed by Arthur Lamothe and released in 1983. The film is a portrait of the Innu people of northern Quebec.

The film was a Genie Award nominee for Best Feature Length Documentary at the 5th Genie Awards in 1984.

References

External links
 

1983 films
1983 documentary films
Canadian documentary films
Documentary films about First Nations
Films directed by Arthur Lamothe
French-language Canadian films
1980s Canadian films